The 1959 Ball State Cardinals football team was an American football team that represented Ball State Teachers College (later renamed Ball State University) in the Indiana Collegiate Conference (ICC) during the 1959 NCAA College Division football season. In its fourth season under head coach Jim Freeman, the team compiled a 1–7 record and finished in last place in the ICC.

Schedule

References

Ball State
Ball State Cardinals football seasons
Ball State Cardinals football